Patrick Schmit (born 1 November 1974) is a Luxembourgish retired competitive figure skater, born in Luxembourg City. He placed 29th at the 1998 Winter Olympics.

Results

References
 Skatabase: 1990s Olympics

External links
 Figure Skating Corner profile

Luxembourgian figure skaters
Olympic figure skaters of Luxembourg
Figure skaters at the 1998 Winter Olympics
Sportspeople from Luxembourg City
1974 births
Living people